Dolphin is a common name of aquatic mammals within the infraorder Cetacea.

Dolphin, Dolphins, The Dolphin or The Dolphins may also refer to:

Arts and entertainment

Film
Dolphins (2000 film), an IMAX documentary
Dolphins, a 2007 film starring Karl Davies
The Dolphins (film), a 2014 comedy-drama feature film

Literature  
The Dolphin (student publication), a publication of John B. Lacson Foundation Maritime University
The Dolphin, a 1973 book of poems by Robert Lowell
The Dolphin (fairy tale), a French literary fairy tale by Madame d'Aulnoy

Music 
Dolphin Stradivarius, a violin built by Antonio Stradivari in 1714
Dolphin (musician), Russian hip hop artist Andrey Vyacheslavovich Lysikov (born 1971)
"The Dolphin", a jazz standard composed by Luiz Eça
"The Dolphins", a 1966 single by Fred Neil
The Dolphin (album), by Stan Getz, 1981
"Dolphin", a song from the 1970 album Parallelograms by Linda Perhacs
"Dolphin", a song from the 1994 album Change Giver by Shed Seven
"Dolphin", a song from the 1995 album The Gold Experience by Prince
"Dolphin", a song from the 2019 album Buoys by Panda Bear
"Dolphins", a song from the 2005 album Black & White 050505 by Simple Minds

Other uses in arts and entertainment
Dolphin (character), a DC Comics superheroine
Dolphin (video game), a 1983 Atari 2600 video game
Dolphins (M. C. Escher), a 1923 woodcut print

Businesses
Dolphin Air, a charter airline based in Dubai, United Arab Emirates
Dolphin Cruise Line, based in Greece 
Dolphin Energy, an Abu Dhabi gas company
Dolphin Gas Project, a GCC gas project
Dolphin Hotel (disambiguation), the name of several establishments
Dolphin Inn, Plymouth, UK
The Dolphin, Hackney, London, UK
Dolphin Interconnect Solutions, a manufacturer of high speed data communication systems
Dolphin Music, an online retailer of musical instruments and recording equipment
Byford Dolphin, a drilling rig
Dolphin Mall, in Miami, Florida, US
Walt Disney World Dolphin, a hotel resort in Florida, US

Computing
Dolphin (emulator), an open-source GameCube and Wii emulator
Dolphin (file manager), an open source file manager
Dolphin Browser, a web browser for Android mobile devices
Dolphin, the codename for the Nintendo GameCube

Military

Aviation
Sopwith Dolphin, a British First World War fighter plane

Navy
, several ships of the Royal Navy
, several ships of the U.S. Navy
, of the Israeli Navy
Dolphin, one of the Queensland Maritime Defence Force Auxiliary Gunboats
 Dolphin (weapon), an ancient naval ramming weapon
 "Dolphins", the common name for Submarine Warfare insignia

People
Dolphin (surname), including a list of people with the name
Dolphin D. Overton (1926–2013), US Air Force Korean War flying ace

Places
Dolphin, Virginia, US, an unincorporated community
Dolphin, Washington, US, an unincorporated community
Dolphin Township, Knox County, Nebraska, US
Dolphin Town, Isles of Scilly, England, a hamlet
Dolphin, Flintshire, a village in the community of Brynford, Wales
Cape Dolphin, Falkland Islands
Dolphin Island (disambiguation), including a list of islands in various countries
Dolphin Lighthouse, off the coast of Mumbai, India
Dolphin Square, a large London apartment block, UK

Sports
Australian Swim Team, nicknamed the Dolphins
Daikyo Dolphins, a member of the defunct Australian Baseball League
Dolphin F.C. (Dublin), a former Irish football team 
Dolphin RFC, an Irish rugby union team based in Cork
Dolphins BC, a basketball club in Botswana
Dolphins F.C. (Port Harcourt), a Nigerian football team
Dolphins United F.C., a football club in the Philippines
Dolphins (cricket team), the KwaZulu Natal cricket team in South Africa 
Dolphins (NRL), a professional rugby league team based in Queensland, Australia
Dräger Dolphin, a recreational rebreather
Frankston Football Club, nicknamed The Dolphins, an Australian rules football club
Jacksonville Dolphins, Jacksonville University's athletic teams
Karachi Dolphins, a Pakistani cricket team
Miami Dolphins, a professional American football team in the National Football League
Nagoya Diamond Dolphins, a Japanese basketball team
Norrköping Dolphins, a professional Swedish basketball club
Paderborn Dolphins, an American football club from Paderborn, Germany
PCU Dolphins, the senior athletic teams of Philippine Christian University
Redcliffe Dolphins, Australian rugby league team
Ulsan Hyundai Mipo Dockyard Dolphins FC, a South Korean football team

Transportation

Aircraft
 De Havilland Dolphin, a 1930s British prototype light biplane
 Eurocopter MH-65 Dolphin, a helicopter used by the United States Coast Guard

Automobiles
 Brilliance Dolphin, a 2014–2015 Chinese city car
 BYD Dolphin, a 2021–present Chinese electric subcompact hatchback
 Karry Dolphin, a 2019–present Chinese electric commercial van
 Sipani Dolphin, a 1982–1997 Indian subcompact hatchback

Watercraft
 Dolphin (1922 yacht), later HMCS Lynx
 Dolphin 15 Senior, an American sailing dinghy design
 Douglas Dolphin, a 1930s amphibious flying boat

Other
 Dolphin and Walrus (locomotives), of the Groudle Glen Railway, Isle of Man
 Florida State Road 836, known as the Dolphin Expressway

Other uses
Dolphin School (disambiguation), various schools in several countries
Dolphin (structure), a man-made marine structure not connected to shore
Dolphin shorts or Dolfins, a style of unisex shorts for athletics
Typhoon Dolphin, the name of 3 tropical cyclones

Senecio 'Hippogriff', a houseplant known as "dolphin plant" because of the shape of its leaves
 Dolphin, codename for GameCube

See also
Mahi-mahi or common dolphinfish
Pompano dolphinfish 
Dolphin gull

 ('The Dolphin'), a Second World War Romanian submarine
 ('The Dolphin'), a Kilo-class submarine
Delfin (disambiguation)
Delfinen (disambiguation)
Delfino (disambiguation)
Dolfijn (disambiguation)
Dolfin (disambiguation)
Delphinus (disambiguation)
Dauphin (disambiguation)